Lake Lashaway is a  pond located near the East Brookfield and North Brookfield, Massachusetts town line.  The Lake Lashaway Community Association’s website is www.LakeLashaway.org.  The town line cuts the lake approximately in half. The lake lies just to the north of state Route 9 as it passes through East Brookfield.

Description
The average depth is 10 feet (3.05 m) with the maximum depth about 18 feet (5.49 m). The water is blue
in color and quite warm in the summertime. Numerous houses and cabins line the shore, being a summertime retreat for many, and full-time residences for others. A well-known children’s summer camp, Camp Atwater, is on the north shore in North Brookfield. Lake Lashaway is part of the Chicopee River Watershed.

Lake Lashaway Dam on the East Brookfield River impounds the waters of the Five Mile River and a local aquifer in North Brookfield, forming Lake Lashaway. Outflow from this dam feeds Quaboag Pond, about two miles (3 km) down the river, the headwaters of the Quaboag River.

Fishing

Lake Lashaway offers good fishing for many warm water fish. A survey conducted in 1994 showed thirteen species including Large and Small-mouth Bass, Chain Pickerel,  Yellow Perch, White Perch, Black Crappie, Bluegill, Pumpkinseed, Brown and Yellow Bullhead, Golden Shiner, and Sucker. The lake was stocked with Northern Pike in the past.

Coordinates

Lake Lashaway Dam

Lake Lashaway

References
   
 East Brookfield River information

Lakes of Worcester County, Massachusetts
Ponds of Massachusetts